Santa Jr. is a 2002 American made-for-television romantic comedy Christmas film starring Lauren Holly and Judd Nelson.  It premiered on Hallmark Channel in 2002. As of 2009, it was shown in the 25 Days of Christmas programming block on ABC Family, but it was not part of the block in 2010.

Plot
While delivering toys, Santa's son (Nick Stabile) is arrested for trespassing because another person impersonating Santa is burglarizing homes. Dispirited, he turns for help to a public defender (Lauren Holly).

Cast

Lauren Holly as Susan Flynn
Judd Nelson as Darryl Bedford
Nick Stabile as Chris Kringle Jr.
Ed Gale as Stan
Diane Robin as Pietra Nero
Jaime P. Gomez as Earl Hernandez
Kimberly Scott as Mrs. Taylor
Charlie Robinson as Judge Wheeler
Eugene M. Davis as DiGregorio
George Wallace as Norm Potter

Reviews
Scott Hettrick of the Entertainment News Service called the movie "The first delightful cable Christmas movie of the season", but added that "There is little of substance here, just lightweight holiday fare to start the season off with jolly good feelings". The Movie Scene called it "a pleasant little Christmas movie which if it crops up on TV and you need something to amuse the children it will do the job and you might enjoy a few bits as well. But it isn't the sort of Christmas movie which you will remember a great deal of a day or so later". Complex.com ranked the movie 2nd in a list "The 15 Most Ridiculous Hallmark Movies Of All Time". "Anyone with even a shred of taste should stay away from this film", the writer reasoned.

See also
 List of Christmas films

References

External links
 

2002 television films
2002 films
2002 romantic comedy films
American Christmas comedy films
American romantic comedy films
Christmas television films
ABC Family original films
Films directed by Kevin Connor
2000s Christmas comedy films
Films scored by Ken Thorne
2000s English-language films
2000s American films